General Sir Walter William Pitt-Taylor  (30 August 187822 November 1950) was a British Army officer who commanded the 3rd Infantry Division.

Military career
Pitt-Taylor was commissioned into the Army Militia as a second lieutenant in the 5th battalion of the Rifle Brigade (The Prince Consort's Own) on 4 December 1895. He transferred to the regular army as a second lieutenant in the 1st Battalion on 18 October 1899, as the Battalion was sent to South Africa to serve in the Second Boer War. They were part of the force sent to relieve Ladysmith, and as such he took part in the battles of Colenso (December 1899), Vaal Krantz and the Tugela Heights (February 1900). He was promoted to lieutenant on 1 August 1900, and served in Natal and in the Transvaal, staying in South Africa throughout the hostilities, which ended with the Peace of Vereeniging on 31 May 1902. For his service in the war, he was appointed a Companion of the Distinguished Service Order (DSO). Following the end of the war, Pitt-Taylor left Cape Town with other men of the battalion on the SS Orissa, which arrived at Southampton in late October 1902, when the battalion was stationed at Portsmouth.

He fought in World War I latterly as Commander of 145th Infantry Brigade and then as Chief of Staff for XIV Corps. After the War he became Military Assistant to the Chief of the Imperial General Staff. He was appointed Director of Military Operations in India in 1920, Commander of 17th Indian Infantry Brigade in c.1922 and Commander of 5th Infantry Brigade in 1925. He went on to be Director of Recruiting & Organisation at the War Office in 1929, General Officer Commanding 3rd Division in 1932 and General Officer Commanding-in-Chief at Western Command, India in 1936 before retiring in 1939.

Family
In 1920 he married Daphne Helen Stronge, daughter of Sir James Stronge, 5th Baronet. Pitt-Taylor did on 22 November 1950 at Barscobe, Castle Douglas, Scotland, aged 72.

References

|-
 

1878 births
1950 deaths
British Army generals
Knights Commander of the Order of the Bath
Companions of the Order of St Michael and St George
Companions of the Distinguished Service Order
Rifle Brigade officers
British Army generals of World War I
British Army personnel of the Second Boer War
People from Kensington
Military personnel from London